The Inferior palpebral nerve (inferior palpebral branches) ascend behind the orbicularis oculi.

They supply the skin and conjunctiva of the lower eyelid, joining at the lateral angle of the orbit with the facial and zygomaticofacial nerves.

References

Maxillary nerve